Son Tae-young (born August 19, 1980) is a South Korean actress and former Miss Korea.

Career
As Miss Daegu, Son Tae-young placed second runner-up (or third place) at the Miss Korea pageant in 2000. She was the country's representative at the 2000 Miss International pageant, where she won 1st runner-up and Miss Photogenic.

Soon later turned to acting, appearing in the films Sad Movie (2005), the critically acclaimed The Railroad (2007), and Crazy Waiting (2008). Son is more prolific in television, with starring and supporting roles in dramas such as One Million Roses (2003), Two Wives (2009), You're the Best, Lee Soon-shin (2013), and Into the Flames (2014).

In 2014, Son played the leading role of a wife with a cheating husband in the Chinese romantic comedy film Love War, opposite Hu Bing and Winston Chao.

Known for her sense of style, she has also hosted several beauty and fashion programs, among them Son Tae-young's Life Magazine (2008), Actress House - Season 2 (2011), and Son Tae-young's W Show! (2013).

Personal life
Son married actor Kwon Sang-woo at the Shilla Hotel on September 28, 2008. On February 6, 2009, she gave birth to a son, christened as Luke (nicknamed Rookie). Their second child, a daughter, was born on January 10, 2015. Son's brother-in-law is pianist and composer, Yiruma.

Filmography

Television series

Film

Variety show

Music video

Awards

References

External links 

 
 
 

1980 births
Living people
South Korean television actresses
South Korean film actresses
Miss International 2000 delegates
Miss Korea delegates